Sarah Tarlow is a British archaeologist and academic. As professor of historical archaeology at the University of Leicester, Tarlow is best known for her work on the archaeology of death and burial. In 2012, Tarlow was awarded the chair in archaeology at the University of Leicester.

Biography
Sarah Tarlow was born in 1967. She obtained a BA in 1989 from Sheffield University, a MPhil (1990) and a PhD (1995) from Cambridge University. Tarlow taught at the University of Wales, Lampeter from 1995 to 2000. In 2000, she became a lecturer in Historical archaeology at the University of Leicester, and in 2006 was promoted to senior lecturer.  In 2012, Tarlow was awarded the chair in archaeology.

Tarlow's research focuses on the historical archaeology of Great Britain and Northern Europe. She has published several books, journals and edited anthologies on the archaeology of death and burial, including the Handbook of the Archaeology of Death and Burial (Oxford Handbooks). Tarlow also studies the archaeology of emotion and issues of archaeological ethics.

From 2011 to 2016, Tarlow directed the large-scale research project, Harnessing the Power of the Criminal Corpse, funded by the Wellcome Trust.  The study focused on the period between the sixteenth century and the twentieth century, and investigated the management, treatment and uses of the criminal corpse in Britain. The project's overall goal was an examination and   discussion of the "changing ideas of self and person as they relate to the body".

Selected publications

Journals
 .

Books

References

External links
 "Harnessing the Criminal Corpse'' website

British women archaeologists
20th-century archaeologists
21st-century archaeologists
Living people
1967 births
Alumni of the University of Sheffield
Alumni of the University of Cambridge
21st-century British women writers
20th-century British women writers